Digital Soundtracks is the sixth studio album by Clock DVA, released on 11 December 1992 by Contempo Records. "E-Wave" is dedicated to Klaus Kinski.

Track listing

Personnel 
Adapted from the Digital Soundtracks liner notes.
Clock DVA
Robert Baker – instruments
Dean Dennis – instruments
Adi Newton – instruments

Release history

References

External links 
 

1992 albums
Clock DVA albums